The L.I.B.R.A. is the eleventh studio album by American rapper T.I. It was released on October 16, 2020 via Grand Hustle Records and Empire Distribution. The title, which references T.I.'s zodiac sign, libra, also doubles as an acronym for "Legend Is Back Running Atlanta". The album, which was initially titled Love & Liability, serves as the final installment of a trilogy, that was preceded by Paperwork (2014) and Dime Trap (2018).

Production on the album was handled by record producers such as Hitmaka, 9th Wonder, June Jenius, Cardiak, Juicy J, David Banner, Lil' C, Thaddeus Dixon. The album features guest appearances from 21 Savage, 42 Dugg, Benny the Butcher, Conway the Machine, Eric Bellinger, Jadakiss, Jeremih, John Legend, Killer Mike, Lil Baby, London Jae, Mozzy, Rapsody, Rick Ross, Snoop Dogg, Young Thug, and comedian Ms. Pat, among others.

Preceded by two singles, "Ring" and "Pardon", the album peaked at number 18 on the Billboard 200 chart and number nine on the Top R&B/Hip-Hop Albums chart in the United States.

Background
Upon signing a recording contract with Columbia Records and releasing his ninth album Paperwork in October 2014, T.I. revealed that Paperwork is part of a trilogy and would be followed up with The Return and Love & Liability. During an interview with Life+Times, T.I. said the next album, or rather, "second act" is The Return, and following that, the "third act" is called Love & Liability. According to T.I. the former is going to be reminiscent of his second album Trap Muzik (2003), while the latter is going to be "like a gangster version of 808s & Heartbreak". In a 2017 interview on The Breakfast Club radio show, T.I. spoke on his trilogy of albums: "I got, like, two, I got, this next album and two, I got three more albums in my head, conceptualized. […] The next one is more like trap music. It’s Trap Muzik 2017. And the one after that, it’s gonna be more like a, uh, love as it pertains to a dope boy."
When speaking on Love & Liability, which ultimately became The L.I.B.R.A., T.I. said “Love & Liability is the story of a young man, who is a solid cat, but his heart finds him in relationships with people who he probably shouldn’t be in relationships with, because of the people they’re in relationships with.

Release and promotion
In October 2020, T.I. revealed that he teamed up with AllHipHop for a stimulus package giveaway: “Since [Donald Trump] said he ain’t giving them stimuluses out until after the election, alright...cool. I’m just gon’ pick up a little bit, man,” he said in the video clip. “We got y’all. Don’t even trip.” All interested fans had to do was vote on their favorite songs from each of T.I.'s previous studio albums in the leadup to the release of The L.I.B.R.A. In total, $12,000 was on the line as one lucky fan was randomly selected to win $1,200 each day.

Critical reception

The L.I.B.R.A. was met with generally favorable reviews from music critics. At Metacritic, which assigns a normalized rating out of 100 to reviews from mainstream publications, the album received an average score of 70 based on four reviews.

Riley Wallace of HipHopDX found the album "could have benefitted from a few snips here and there, but overall it's a reasonably satisfying listen and a tangible reminder that the self-proclaimed King Of The South hasn't lost his edge". Chase McMullen of Beats Per Minute wrote that the project is "a generous, compulsively enjoyable statement, unburdened of commercial pressure in a way that's all too rare in this numbers game". AllMusic's Fred Thomas wrote: "The entire record is a victorious display of self-celebration, but the impact of T.I.'s years in the rap game are felt most directly on tracks where he's matching wit and lyrical dexterity with rappers from the generation that directly followed him". In a mixed review, Trey Alston of Pitchfork resumed: "these songs introduce nothing new to T.I.'s story or sound, but they're exactly what you'd expect to find 13 tracks deep into a curated rap playlist on a streaming service".

Track listing
Credits are adapted from Tidal.

Personnel
Credits for The L.I.B.R.A. adapted from AllMusic.

21 Savage – Featured Artist
42 Dugg – Featured Artist
Eric Bellinger – Featured Artist
Benny the Butcher – Featured Artist
Alec Beretz – Featured Artist
Conway the Machine – Featured Artist
Domani – Featured Artist
Jadakiss – Featured Artist
London Jae – Featured Artist
Jeremih – Featured Artist
Killer Mike – Featured Artist
John Legend – Primary Artist
Lil Baby – Featured Artist
Ernestine Johnson Morrison – Featured Artist
Mozzy – Featured Artist
Ms. Pat – Featured Artist
Rahky – Featured Artist
Rapsody – Featured Artist
Rick Ross – Primary Artist
Snoop Dogg – Primary Artist
T.I. – Primary Artist
Tokyo Jetz – Featured Artist
Young Thug – Featured Artist

Charts

References

2020 albums
T.I. albums
Grand Hustle Records albums
Empire Distribution albums
Albums produced by 9th Wonder
Albums produced by Cardiak
Albums produced by David Banner
Albums produced by Hitmaka
Albums produced by Juicy J
Albums produced by Lil' C (record producer)
Albums produced by Mars (record producer)